Abdelaziz Mohamed (born 20 October 2001) is a Qatari sprinter. In 2019, he competed in the men's 200 metres at the 2019 World Athletics Championships held in Doha, Qatar. He set a time of 20.75 seconds and he did not qualify to compete in the semi-finals.

In 2018, he won the gold medal in the boys' 200 metres event at the 2018 Summer Youth Olympics held in Buenos Aires, Argentina.

References

External links 
 

Living people
2001 births
Place of birth missing (living people)
Qatari male sprinters
Athletes (track and field) at the 2018 Summer Youth Olympics
World Athletics Championships athletes for Qatar
Youth Olympic gold medalists in athletics (track and field)